Anita Sharp-Bolster (28 August 1895 – 1 June 1985) was an Irish-born American actress who appeared in 88 films and 12 TV series from 1928 to 1978. She was sometimes billed as Anita Bolster.

Early life
She was born 28 August 1895 in Glenlohane, Kanturk, County Cork, Ireland.

Career

Stage
Sharp-Bolster's Broadway credits include Kathleen, Pygmalion, and Lady in Waiting.

Film
Sharp-Bolster debuted in the British film What Money Can Buy (1928). Her American film debut came in 1942 in Saboteur, directed by Alfred Hitchcock. In a 2013 book, one writer described her as "one of the most riveting human gargoyles in Hollywood films."

Radio
Sharp-Bolster worked with the BBC in the UK.

Television
Billed as Anita Bolster, she appeared in three episodes of Dark Shadows in March of 1968.  Bolster portrayed a witch named Bathia Mapes who failed to remove a curse of vampirism from Barnabas Collins.

Personal life
Sharp-Bolster was married to Jacob Schwartz. She died in North Miami, Florida.

Selected filmography

What Money Can Buy (1928) - Cleaner
S.O.S. (1928) - Mme. Karensky
Would You Believe It! (1929) - Presbyterian
Number, Please (1931)
The Bells (1931)
Mr. Bill the Conqueror (1932)
Strip! Strip! Hooray!!! (1932) - Bit Part (uncredited)
The Temperance Fete (1932) - Teacher
Lassie from Lancashire (1938) - Woman in Audience (uncredited)
The Villiers Diamond (1938) - Mlle. Dulac (uncredited)
Saboteur (1942) - Lorelei - Circus Troupe
This Above All (1942) - Tea Shop Customer (uncredited)
I Married an Angel (1942) - Mrs. Kipper (uncredited)
The Pride of the Yankees (1942) - Sasha's Mother (uncredited)
Nightmare (1942) - Mrs. McDonald - Housekeeper
Journey for Margaret (1942) - Woman with Cat (uncredited)
London Blackout Murders (1943) - Mrs. Pringle 
Forever and a Day (1943) - Mrs. Garrow
Flesh and Fantasy (1943) - Relative (uncredited)
Thumbs Up (1943) - Mrs. Smithers, the Landlady (uncredited)
Heaven Can Wait (1943) - Mrs. Cooper-Cooper (uncredited)
Henry Aldrich Haunts a House (1943) - Mrs. Norris (uncredited)
The Lodger (1944) - Wiggy - Barfly (uncredited)
Passport to Destiny (1944) - Agnes 
Going My Way (1944) - Mrs. Hattie Quimp (uncredited)
The White Cliffs of Dover (1944) - Miller (uncredited)
The Doughgirls (1944) - Maid (uncredited)
Our Hearts Were Young and Gay (1944) - Stewardess (uncredited)
The Picture of Dorian Gray (1945) - Lady Harborough (uncredited)
Kitty (1945) - Mullens
My Name Is Julia Ross (1945) - Sparkes
The Lost Weekend (1945) - Mrs. Foley
Scarlet Street (1945) - Mrs. Michaels
The Thin Man Goes Home (1945) - Hilda
Dressed to Kill (1946) - Teacher on Museum Tour (uncredited)
The Two Mrs. Carrolls (1947) - Christine
Dark Passage (1947) - Woman (uncredited)
Love From a Stranger (1947) - Ethel
The Judge Steps Out (1947) - Martha, the Maid 
The Woman in White (1948) - Mrs. Todd
The Perfect Woman (1949) - Lady Diana
Saints and Sinners (1949) - (uncredited)
Waterfront (1950) - Mrs. Simon (uncredited)
Talk of a Million (1951) - Miss Rafferty
Madame Louise (1951) - Cafe Proprietress
Botany Bay (1952) - Moll Cudlip
The Final Test (1953) - Daisy (uncredited)
Raising a Riot (1955) - Mrs. Buttons 
The Hornet's Nest (1955) - Miss Anderson
Reluctant Bride (1955) - Mrs. Fogarty
Tears for Simon (1956) - Miss Gill
The Rising of the Moon (1957) - Colonel Frobisher's Wife (2nd Episode)
Stormy Crossing (1958) - First Nurse
The Man Who Liked Funerals (1959) - Lady Hunter
Alive and Kicking (1959) - Postmistress
School for Scoundrels (1960) - Maid
The Day They Robbed the Bank of England (1960) - Maid (uncredited)
The House in Marsh Road (1960) - Mrs. O'Brien
The Hands of Orlac (1960) - Volchett's Assistant (uncredited)
Payroll (1961) - Landlady (uncredited)
On the Beat (1962) - Hair-Salon Customer (uncredited)
The List of Adrian Messenger (1963) - Mrs. Slattery (uncredited)
Father Came Too! (1964) - Mrs. Trumper 
Promise Her Anything (1966) - Mrs. Egan - Baby Sitter (uncredited)
The Boy Cried Murder (1966) - Mrs. Wetherall
Craze (1974) - Woman at will reading. (uncredited)
The Adventure of Sherlock Holmes' Smarter Brother (1975) - Old lady (uncredited)
Jabberwocky (1977) - Old Crone / Woman with Stone (uncredited)

Television
 Educated Evans (1957, 1 episode)
  The Saint (TV show, Season 1, Episode 2, 1962) as Ada Harmer
 Dark Shadows (1968, 3 episodes) as Bathia Mapes
 Jude the Obscure (1971) as Mrs Trott
 Skiboy (1973) as Mountain Witch
 Thriller (1976, 1 episode).

References

External links

 
 
 
 
 

1895 births
1985 deaths
Irish film actresses
Irish radio actresses
Irish stage actresses
Irish television actresses
Irish expatriates in the United States
People from Kanturk
20th-century American actresses